Progress M-57, identified by NASA as Progress 22P, was a Progress spacecraft used to resupply the International Space Station. It was a Progress-M 11F615A55 spacecraft, with the serial number 357.

Launch
Progress M-57 was launched by a Soyuz-U carrier rocket from Site 1/5 at the Baikonur Cosmodrome. Launch occurred at 15:08:18 UTC on 24 June 2006.

Docking
The spacecraft docked with the Pirs module at 16:25 UTC on 26 June. It remained docked for 204 days before undocking at 23:23:52 UTC on 16 January 2007 to make way for Progress M-59. It was deorbited at 02:29 UTC on 17 January 2007. The spacecraft burned up in the atmosphere over the Pacific Ocean, with any remaining debris landing in the ocean at around 03:15:20 UTC.

Progress M-57 carried supplies to the International Space Station, including food, water and oxygen for the crew and equipment for conducting scientific research.

See also

 List of Progress flights
 Uncrewed spaceflights to the International Space Station

References

Spacecraft launched in 2006
Progress (spacecraft) missions
Spacecraft which reentered in 2007
Supply vehicles for the International Space Station
Spacecraft launched by Soyuz-U rockets